Yash Chopra (1932–2012) was an Indian film director and producer known for his works in Bollywood. Acknowledged as one of the greatest filmmakers from the country, he was credited by the media for "changing the face of romance to become a brand" in the industry. He made his directorial debut with the family drama Dhool Ka Phool, which was produced by his elder brother Baldev Raj. The film, released in 1959, became a commercial success worldwide and gave him critical acclaim. Chopra's next film, Dharmputra (1961), failed to perform well at the box office but won the National Film Award for Best Feature Film in Hindi. In 1965, he directed the drama Waqt about a family who are separated due to a natural disaster. A commercial success, it was one of the earliest Indian films to star an ensemble cast and won a first Best Director trophy for him at the Filmfare Awards.

The 1980s was the most unsuccessful period of his career. Following the failure of his romantic drama Silsila (1981), which he co-wrote, directed and produced, Chopra's popularity began to wane. According to his biographer, the British academic Rachel Dwyer, this was because action and crime films were more popular at the time while most of his films were romances. Chopra experimented with making two action films, Mashaal (1984) and Vijay (1988), which underperformed financially but were well-received by critics. Chandni was his only box-office success of the decade. Starring Sridevi in the title role, the film tells the story of a young woman who is accused of being responsible for her lover's accident. Chopra's career began to revive since its premiere in 1989; the feature was named the Best Popular Film Providing Wholesome Entertainment at the 37th National Film Awards and considered one of his best films.

Chopra next directed and produced the 1991 film Lamhe. Although it did not succeed at the Indian box office, it performed well in foreign countries. Parampara (1993) was the last film directed by Chopra but not produced under his company; reviewers were critical of it due to its clichéd storyline. The thriller Darr (1993) and the romantic comedy Yeh Dillagi (1994)—both of which were produced by him, with Chopra serving as a director for the former—succeeded commercially. He later produced his son Aditya's directorial debut Dilwale Dulhania Le Jayenge (1995), the longest-running film in Indian cinema history. Chopra's next film, Dil To Pagal Hai (1997), was a commercial success and won the Filmfare Award for Best Film but was panned by critics. After producing several films that performed well financially and critically, including Mohabbatein (2000) and Saathiya (2002), Chopra returned to directing with the 2004 cross-border romantic film Veer-Zaara, which critics lauded for its portrayal of India–Pakistan relations. The work won several best film trophies at major award functions, including that of Filmfare. Jab Tak Hai Jaan (2012) was the last film directed by him before his death.

Films

References

Bibliography

External links 

 

Director filmographies
Indian filmographies